Why Girls Say No is a 1927 American silent comedy film featuring Max Davidson.

Plot
Every boy on the street is in love with Becky.  But her father, Papa Whisselberg, insists that they be Jewish.  While getting her hair cut, Becky encounters an Irish-looking boy who can't take his eyes off of her.  He tries to follow her home but is temporarily sidelined by a policeman who winds up falling into a pit of water. He finally meets up with her, and she falls for him.  Becky warns him against entering, saying her father would be brokenhearted if she married a non-Jewish boy.  That night, the boy climbs the fire escape to meet Becky in her room.  At the same time, a thief enters the house, the policeman in pursuit.  Confusion ensues: the thief tries to disguise himself as a woman in a nightgown but his pants give him away.  As he escorts the captured thief, the policeman again falls into the pit of water; the scene fades as he throws down his badge.

On the occasion of Papa's birthday, Becky welcomes the boy for the party.  Papa warns Becky that he doesn't want an Irishman for her.  Trying to be helpful, the boy helps clean up by bringing food into the kitchen.  Mama leaves for a minute while the boy opens the oven to see a cake which collapses because of the open oven door.  Embarrassed, he shuts the door, only to have Mama return to warn him against opening the oven door because the cake might collapse.  Concerned about the impression he'll make, he secretly removes the cake and takes it out the back door to think of what to do.  Eyeing a bicycle pump, he uses it to return the cake to its air-filled state, and sneaks it back into the oven without Mama seeing. Everyone is seated for the presentation of Papa's cake.  He begins to cut into it, but the nearby candles mysteriously blow out.  After repeatedly trying to cut the cake only to have nearby objects flung from the force of air, Maxie reveals that the boy was responsible for making the cake full of air.  Papa angrily throws him out of the house, but Becky follows, saying she's going to marry him.  After a humorous pursuit down the streets of Los Angeles, Papa finally catches up as Becky and the boy enter his house.  Inside the house Papa yells at the boy that his daughter is not going to marry an Irish boy.  The boy then introduces his parents, clearly Orthodox Jews, leading to a happy ending.  The film fades as Papa chases Maxie for playing a prank on him.

Cast
 Marjorie Daw - Becky
 Creighton Hale - The boy
 Max Davidson - Papa Whisselberg
 Ann Brody - Mama Whisselberg
 Spec O'Donnell - Maxie Whisselberg
 Oliver Hardy - Police Officer
 Jesse De Vorska - Mr. Ginsberg
 Noah Young - Angry motorist (uncredited)

See also
 List of American films of 1927

External links

1927 films
American black-and-white films
1927 comedy films
American silent short films
Films directed by Leo McCarey
1920s English-language films
1920s American films
Silent American comedy films